Eucalyptus erectifolia, commonly known as Stirling Range mallee, is a species of mallee that is endemic to Western Australia. It has smooth bark, narrow lance-shaped adult leaves, flower buds in groups of between seven and thirteen, white flowers and cup-shaped fruit.

Description
Flowering occurs between March and May and the flowers are white.

Taxonomy and naming
Eucalyptus erectifolia was first formally described in 1986 by Ian Brooker and Stephen Hopper from a specimen collected in the Stirling Range in 1981. The description was published in the journal Nuytsia. The specific epithet (erectifolia) is derived from the Latin "erectus" and -folia meaning "leaved" referring to the way the leaves are held in the crown.

This species is part of the subgenus Eucalyptus series Diversiformae, a group of mallees that all have adult leaves held erect, buds with a single unscarred operculum and pyramidal seeds.

Distribution and habitat
Stirling Range mallee grows in sandy-loamy-gravelly soils in open shrubland on hillslopes and sandplains in the Stirling Range.

Conservation status
Eucalyptus erectifolia is classified as "Priority Four" by the Government of Western Australia Department of Parks and Wildlife, meaning that is rare or near threatened.

See also
List of Eucalyptus species

References

Eucalypts of Western Australia
Trees of Australia
erectifolia
Myrtales of Australia
Plants described in 1986
Taxa named by Ian Brooker
Taxa named by Stephen Hopper